Africa is a collection of songs from the 1970s by South African singer Miriam Makeba. The collection was produced and released on CD by Novus Records in October 1991.

Track listing
 "Mbube"
 "Nomeva"
 "Olilili"
 "Suliram"
 "Retreat Song"
 "Click Song"
 "Saduva"
 "Iya Guduza"
 "Lakutshon Ilanga"
 "Umhome"
 "Amanpondo"
 "Dubula"
 "Kwendini"
 "Umhome"
 "Pole Mze"
 "Le fleuve"
 "Qhude"
 "Mayibuye"
 "Maduna"
 "Kilimanjaro"
 "Kwazulu (In the Land of the Zulus)"
 "Nongqongqq (To Those We Love)"
 "Khawuleza"
 "Ndodemnyama (Beware Verwoerd)"

References

1991 compilation albums
Miriam Makeba albums
Novus Records albums